Kiliyur  is a village in [ulundurpet taluk] of KALLAKURUCHI district in Tamil Nadu, India.

Demographics 

As per the 2001 census, Kiliyur had a population of 674 with 331 males and 343 females. The sex ratio was 1036 and the literacy rate, 85.14.

References 

 

Villages in Tiruchirappalli district